Joe Hirst (born ) is an English professional rugby league footballer who has played in the 2000s and 2010s. Joe signed for Sheffield Eagles in 2009, and in 2011 won the Supporters Player of the year award, along with the Players Player of the award, as Sheffield reached the Championship Grand Final.

References

External links
Statistics at rugbyleagueproject.org

1987 births
Living people
English rugby league players
Featherstone Rovers players
Halifax R.L.F.C. players
Rugby league players from Wakefield
Rugby league second-rows
Rugby league locks
Sheffield Eagles players
Wakefield Trinity players